"You Want This" is a song by American singer Janet Jackson from her fifth studio album, Janet (1993). Released as the album's seventh single (sixth and final in the U.S.) in October 1994, the track was written and produced by Jackson and Jimmy Jam and Terry Lewis. The single version, also used in the music video, featured an additional rap verse from MC Lyte. The song was listed in the Rock Song Index: The 7500 Most Important Songs for the Rock and Roll Era (2005) by Bruce Pollock.

Song information
Based on samples from Diana Ross & the Supremes' 1968 song "Love Child" and Kool & the Gang's 1973 song "Jungle Boogie", the song is about Jackson being told by her girls that a guy is watching and wanting her. Jackson proclaims if the guy wants to be with her, he has to work for it. The single contains two B-sides, the janet. track "New Agenda" and the then-unreleased "70's Love Groove", which also appears on 1995's janet. Remixed.

MC Lyte said of the song: "By that time, Janet and I were friends. It was just a matter of her asking if I wanted to do it. I was just about to go on tour with her and do her U.S. leg. Coupled with that, they asked me to do a song with her that we could perform while we were on that tour.”

Critical reception
Larry Flick from Billboard described it as "a bouncy ditty that plunges from a sample of "Love Child" by the Supremes into a rollicking jack/funk beat." He added, "The groove sparks an appealing vocal that is by turns playful and seductive."

Chart performance
The single peaked at number eight on the Billboard Hot 100 and number nine on the Hot R&B/Hip-Hop Songs, and was moderately successful internationally, making it to the top twenty in the UK, Australia, and New Zealand. The single entered the UK R&B Singles chart at #2.

Music video
The accompanying music video for "You Want This" was directed by Keir McFarlane and filmed in Palm Desert, California on June 15, 1994. Loosely based on Russ Meyer's 1965 film, Faster, Pussycat! Kill! Kill!, it centers around Jackson as a female gang leader with the singer and her friends encountering two men. MC Lyte declared, "I was totally psyched to be in a video with Janet Jackson. The only thing I wish I did know how to do was dance [laughs]. Have I been able to dance I could have really participated." A black-and-white version of the video was first released to music channels, while a colorized version was released one month later. CST Entertainment Imaging Inc. was responsible for the transformation, with 30 to 40 members of the company's Color F/X division split into three shifts and worked for nearly three weeks to create this version. Both versions are available on the 1994 video compilation janet. The colorized version is featured on the repackage of 2001's All for You as well as the 2004 DVD From Janet to Damita Jo: The Videos.

Live performances
Jackson has performed the song on five of her tours, janet. Tour, Rock Witchu Tour, the Number Ones, Up Close and Personal, Unbreakable World Tour, and the State of the World Tour. Michael Jackson would often add a vocal sample of the opening "you know you want me" line from "You Want This" in live performances of his song "Dangerous".

Track listings

U.S. 12" promo single (SPRO-12696)
 Disco Theory (No Rap) – 6:16
 E-Smoove's Underdub – 7:21
 E-Smoove's House Anthem – 9:48
 E-Smoove's House Dub – 6:32

U.S. 12" single (Y-38455)
 Mafia & Fluxy Club Mix – 6:28
 Mafia & Fluxy Dancehall Mix – 4:31
 Spoiled Milk. Remix – 4:44
 Remix – 4:46
 "New Agenda" – 4:00
 "70's Love Groove" – 5:45

U.S. promo CD single (DPRO-12696)
 E-Smoove's Anthem 7" – 4:24
 Smoove Soul 7" – 4:16
 E-Smoove's Anthem Dub – 6:32
 Disco Theory – 6:16

U.S. promo CD single (DPRO-14212)
U.S. CD single (V25H-38455)
 Remix – 4:46
 LP Edit – 4:15
 Mafia & Fluxy Dancehall Mix – 4:31
 Spoiled Milk. Remix – 4:44
 "New Agenda" – 4:00
 "70's Love Groove" – 5:45

U.S. cassette single (4Y-38466)
 E-Smoove's House Anthem – 9:48
 Disco Theory (No Rap) – 6:16
 "70's Love Groove" – 5:45
 E-Smoove's Underdub – 7:21
 E-Smoove's Anthem Dub – 6:32
 Smoove Soul 12" – 6:20

UK 12" promo single (VSTXDJ 1519)
 E-Smoove's House Anthem – 9:48
 E-Smoove's Anthem Dub – 6:32
 E-Smoove's Underdub – 7:21
 Funk Extravaganza – 7:42
 Smoove Soul 12" – 6:20

UK 12" single (VST 1519)
 E-Smoove's House Anthem – 9:48
 E-Smoove's Anthem Dub – 6:32
 E-Smoove's Underdub – 7:21
 Disco Theory – 6:16
 Smoove Soul 7" – 4:16

UK CD 1 (VSCDT 1519)
Australian CD single (8926692)
 Remix – 4:46
 E-Smoove's Anthem 7" – 4:16
 Mafia & Fluxy Dancehall Mix – 4:31
 Spoiled Milk. Remix – 4:44
 Disco Theory – 6:16
 Funk Extravaganza – 7:42
 Smoove Soul 12" – 6:20

UK CD 2 (VSCDG/T1519)
 LP Edit – 4:15
 Mafia & Fluxy Club Mix – 6:29
 "70's Love Groove" – 5:45
 "And on and On" – 4:49

Japanese 3" CD single (VJDP10235)
 Remix – 4:46
 "New Agenda" – 4:00

Official remixes
 Album version – 5:05
 LP edit – 4:15
 Remix featuring MC Lyte – 4:46
 Mafia & Fluxy Dancehall Remix – 4:31
 Mafia & Fluxy Club Mix – 6:28
 Disco Theory (No Rap) – 6:14
 Disco Theory – 6:14
 E-Smoove's Anthem 7" – 4:24
 E-Smoove's House Anthem – 9:43
 E Smoove's Anthem Dub – 6:32
 E-Smoove's Underdub – 7:21
 Smoove Soul 7" – 4:16
 Smoove Soul 12" – 6:20
 Funk Extravaganza – 7:42
 Spoiled Milk. Remix – 4:44

Charts

Certifications

References

1993 songs
1994 singles
Janet Jackson songs
Songs written by Janet Jackson
Songs written by Jimmy Jam and Terry Lewis
Songs written by Pam Sawyer
Songs written by Henry Cosby
Songs written by R. Dean Taylor
Songs written by Frank Wilson (musician)
Songs written by Deke Richards
Song recordings produced by Jimmy Jam and Terry Lewis
Music videos directed by Keir McFarlane
New jack swing songs